Powderhouse Productions is an American television production company established in 1994.

Origins
As early as 1986, Powderhouse co-founders Joel Olicker and Tug Yourgrau met while working to produce a documentary for WGBH, the public television station located in Boston, Massachusetts. The collaboration on this documentary for WGBH led them to conceive their own independent production company that would focus on their own brand of nonfiction television programming. In 1994, Olicker and Yourgrau officially began work under the Powderhouse moniker. Powderhouse's first office facilities were located in the basement of a Dunkin' Donuts restaurant location in Powder House Square, Somerville, Massachusetts.

Meaning of the name

The name "Powderhouse" is derived from a conflict during the American Revolution over gunpowder stored in the Provincial Powder House (still standing in Powder House Square near Tufts University in Somerville). The province and its towns were to share the powder, but the towns had removed their allotments. When William Brattle, a Cambridge loyalist, so informed the British commander, General Thomas Gage, the British became concerned that patriot elements might seize the provincial powder as well. On September 1, 1774, British soldiers removed 250 half barrels of powder from the Powder House. One detachment marched to Cambridge and carried off two small cannons.

The founders

Joel Olicker

A native New Yorker, he began his career at Valkhn Films, where he cut segments for the classic CBS children's series Captain Kangaroo.  After a  two-year teaching stint at Hampshire College, he was employed at WGBH, eventually editing and/or producing for the national series Nova, Frontline, The American Experience and others. At Powderhouse, he helped launch the  Emmy-winning Discovery Channel series, Discover Magazine. He has produced and directed award-winning  specials such as Engineering The Impossible, the Emmy-nominated series Extreme Engineering and numerous hours for the WGBH Science Unit and the Discovery Channel.

Tug Yourgrau

Tug Yourgrau is both an award-winning filmmaker and a Tony-nominated playwright. He currently serves as Executive Producer of the Raising Cain Project for PBS and as Co-Executive Producer of Extreme Engineering for The Discovery Channel.  Most recently, Tourgrau completed The Great Pink Scare funded by ITVS.  In 2001, Tug produced, directed and wrote Secrets, Lies, and  Atomic Spies for PBS's Nova.  His play The Song of Jacob Zulu, ran on Broadway in 1993 and led to six Tony nominations.

Programs and series produced by Powderhouse Productions

References

External links

Powderhouse MySpace Page
Build it Bigger - Official Discovery Website
Extreme Engineering - Official Discovery Page
The Great Pink Scare - Official PBS Website

Television production companies of the United States
Mass media companies established in 1994